Alphaea is a genus of tiger moths in the family Erebidae. The genus was erected by Francis Walker in 1855. They are found on India, Sri Lanka, Myanmar and Java only.

Description
Palpi short and hairy, which extending beyond the frons. Hind tibia with two pairs of spurs. Forewings are rather long and narrow.

Species

Subgenus Alphaea sensu stricto 
Alphaea anopunctata (Oberthür, 1896)
Alphaea dellabrunai Saldaitis & Ivinskis, 2008
Alphaea fulvohirta Walker, 1855
Alphaea hongfena Fang, 1983

Subgenus Flavalphaea Dubatolov & Kishida, 2005 
Alphaea impleta (Walker, [1865])
Alphaea khasiana (Rothschild, 1910)

Subgenus Nayaca Moore, 1879 
Alphaea chiyo Dubatolov & Kishida, 2005
Alphaea florescens (Moore, 1879)
Alphaea imbuta (Walker, 1855)
Alphaea rothschildi Dubatolov & Kishida, 2005
Alphaea turatii (Oberthür, 1911)

References

 , 2005: Review of the genus Alphaea Walker, 1855 (Lepidoptera, Arctiidae). Tinea 18 (4): 241-252, Tokyo.
 , 1983: A new species of Alphaea from China (Lepidoptera: Arctiidae). Acta Entomologica Sinica 26 (2): 216-217, Beijing (in Chinese).
 , 2008: Alphaea dellabrunai sp. n. (Lepidoptera, Arctiidae) from China. Acta Zoologica Lituanica 18 (3): 166-168, Vilnius.

Spilosomina
Moth genera